The Queen's Prize pairs event took place on 9 and 10 April 2018 at the Belmont Shooting Centre in Brisbane. The winners were determined by the cumulative points each team had accrued over both days of competition.

Records
Prior to this competition, the existing Games record was as follows:

Schedule
The schedule was as follows:

All times are Australian Eastern Standard Time (UTC+10)

Results
The results are as follows:

References

Shooting at the 2018 Commonwealth Games